Anth may refer to the following:

Anth, short for Anth: A Dream for a Better Tomorrow, 1994 Indian action film
ANTH domain, protein domain
Anth (name)

See also

ANH (disambiguation)
Ankh (disambiguation)
Ant (disambiguation)
Anta (disambiguation)
Ante (disambiguation)
Anti (disambiguation)
ANTM (disambiguation)
Anto (disambiguation)
Arth (disambiguation)
Ath (disambiguation)
NTH (disambiguation)